North Korea competed in the 2009 East Asian Games which were held in Hong Kong, China from December 5, 2009 to December 13, 2009.

Medalists

Gold

Jong Chun Mi Dec 8 2009 Weightlifting 58 kg Women
Pak Hyon Suk Dec 9 2009 Weightlifting 63 kg Women
Kim Kum Sok Dec 8 2009 Weightlifting 69 kg Men
Kim Un Guk Dec 7 2009 Weightlifting 62 kg Men

Silver

Paek Un Hui Dec 8 2009 Weightlifting 53 kg Women

Bronze
Jo Yong Suk-Shooting 10m Air Pistol Women
Pang Kum Chol Dec 9 2009 Weightlifting 77 kg Men
O Jong Ae Dec 8 2009 Weightlifting 58 kg Women
Cha Kum Chol Dec 7 2009 Weightlifting 62 kg Men
Ryang Chun Hwa Dec 7 2009 Weightlifting 48 kg Women

Events

Judo

Gold
Kim Kyong-Jin Dec 13 2009 Judo -60 kg Men

Silver
Ri Chol-Ryong Dec 13 2009 Judo -66 kg Men  
Pak Song-Il Dec 12 2009 Judo -90 kg Men  
Pak Ok-Song Dec 13 2009 Judo -48 kg Women  
Rim Yun-Hui Dec 13 2009 Judo -57 kg Women

Bronze
Kim Chol Su Dec 13 2009 Judo -73 kg Men  
Won Ok Im Dec 12 2009 Judo -63 kg Women  
Hyon Jong Hui Dec 12 2009 Judo -70 kg Women

Football

See also
 North Korea at the Asian Games
 North Korea at the Olympics
 Sport in North Korea

References

https://web.archive.org/web/20091209032525/http://results.2009eastasiangames.hk/en/Root.mvc/MedalCountry/PRK

2009 East Asian Games
2009 in North Korean sport
North Korea at the East Asian Games